A nicotine lozenge is a modified-release dosage tablet (usually flavored) that contains a dose of nicotine polacrilex, which dissolves slowly in the mouth to release nicotine over the course of 20 to 30 minutes. Nicotine lozenges are intended to help individuals quit smoking and are generally an over-the-counter medication. Nicotine lozenges are commonly found in 2 mg and 4 mg strengths, although other strengths may be found. The nicotine is absorbed through the lining of the mouth and enters the blood vessels. It is used as an aid in nicotine replacement therapy (NRT), a process for smoking cessation.

Side effects

 Nausea
 Mouth irritation 
Sore throat
 Heartburn
 Hiccups
 Cravings for cigarettes
 Restlessness
 Difficulty concentrating

Drug interactions
There are few interactions between nicotine and prescription medications (e.g. adenosine, cimetidine, varenicline), but the act of quitting smoking can impact the effect of other medications. Some of the medications are: 

 Antipsychotic medications
 Heart-related medications 
 Caffeine

Contraindications and precautions 
Nicotine replacement therapy cannot be used in those with any type of nicotine sensitivity. Nicotine lozenge should not be used in those with soy allergies. 

Pregnant women or women who are breast feeding should speak with their health care providers and get their approval before using nicotine lozenges.

Nicotine lozenge should be used in caution in those with the following:

 Diabetes
 Heart disease
 Asthma
 Stomach ulcers
 A recent heart attack
 High blood pressure
 A history of irregular heartbeat
Mouth problems
 Been prescribed another medication to help quit smoking

Symptoms of overdose 
Symptoms of nicotine overdose include the following:

 Vomiting
 Diarrhea
 Dizziness
 Irregular heartbeat

Storage and disposal 

It is recommended that nicotine lozenges be kept in the original container, at room temperature and away from excessive heat or moisture. The container should be stored in a secure location away from children or pets.

Unused lozenges should be taken to a medication take-back program or otherwise disposed of in accordance with applicable laws.

See also 

 Nicotine replacement therapy
 nicotine gum
 Nicotine patch

References

External links 
 Nicotine lozenge entry in the public domain NCI Dictionary of Cancer Terms

Smoking cessation